Herbert von Einem (February 16, 1905 in Sarrebourg, Lorraine, – August 5, 1983 in Göttingen) was a German art historian.

Life and work
Von Einem studied art history at the University of Göttingen, the Humboldt-Universität Berlin and the Ludwig Maximilian University of Munich. In 1928, he completed his PhD, entitled Die Plastik der Lüneburger Goldenen Tafel under Georg Vitzthum von Eckstädt, director of the art history seminar in Göttingen. In 1935 he wrote his Habilitationsschrift at the Martin-Luther-University Halle-Wittenberg on Carl Ludwig Fernow. In 1937 he was assistant of Vitzthum in Göttingen, and in 1938 lecturer in art history. During the Nazi era, he promoted a nationalist-defined art history. From 1943 to 1945 he taught art history at the University of Greifswald.

In 1947, Von Einem was appointed professor of art history at the University of Bonn and launched there, together with Heinrich Lützeler, the Institute of the History of Art, which he increased in the following years. Until 1971, with Lützeler, Von Einem was also editor of the Bonner Beiträge zur Kunstwissenschaft. He retired in 1970. His book on Michelangelo was translated into five languages.

References

Select publications
 Caspar David Friedrich. Berlin: Rembrandt-Verlag, 1938.
 Carl Ludwig Fernow, Römische Briefe an Johann Pohrt 1793–1798. Berlin: W. de Gruyter, 1944.
 Die Bildnisse der deutschen Künstler in Rom, 1800–1830. Berlin: Deutscher Verein für Kunstwissenschaft, 1952.
 Beiträge zu Goethes Kunstauffassung. Hamburg: von Schröder, 1956.
 Michelangelo: Bildhauer, Maler, Baumeister. Berlin: Gebrüder Mann, 1959.
 Stil und Überlieferung: Aufsätze zur Kunstgeschichte des Abendlandes. Dusseldorf: L. Schwann, 1971. 
 Das Programm der Stanza della Segnatura im Vatikan.  Opladen: Westdeutscher Verlag, 1971.
 Giorgione: der Maler als Dichter.  Mainz and Wiesbaden: Verlag der Akademie der Wissenschaften und der Literatur, 1972.
 Die Medicimadonna Michelangelos. Opladen: Westdeutscher Verlag, 1973.
 "Die Folgen des Krieges": ein Alterswerk von Peter Paul Rubens. Opladen: Westdeutscher Verlag, 1975.
 Deutsche Malerei des Klassizismus und der Romantik, 1760–1840. Munich: Beck, 1978.

Further reading
 Gert von der Osten and Georg Kauffmann, eds., Festschrift für Herbert von Einem zum 16. Februar 1965, Berlin 1965
 Florens Deuchler et al., Schülerfestgabe für Herbert von Einem zum 16. Februar 1965 (1965)
 Willi Hirdt and Tilmann Buddensieg, eds., In memoriam Herbert von Einem: Reden (1983)
 Metzler-Kunsthistoriker-Lexikon, Stuttgart and Weimar 1999, pp. 70–73.

External links
Dictionary of Art Historians: Einem, Herbert von
Karlsruher Institut für Technologie: Institut Kunst- und Baugeschichte/Fachgebiet Kunstgeschichte: von Einem, Herbert

German art historians
Commanders Crosses of the Order of Merit of the Federal Republic of Germany
1905 births
1983 deaths
People from Sarrebourg